The 1936 Montana gubernatorial election took place on November 3, 1936. Incumbent Governor of Montana Elmer Holt, who became governor in 1935 upon the death of Frank Henry Cooney, ran for re-election. He was challenged in the Democratic primary by a number of challengers, and was narrowly defeated for renomination by United States Congressman Roy E. Ayers of Montana's 2nd congressional district. Ayers advanced to the general election, where he faced Frank A. Hazelbaker, the former Lieutenant Governor of Montana and the Republican nominee. Following a close election, Ayers narrowly defeated Hazelbaker to win what would be his first and only term as governor.

Democratic primary

Candidates
Roy E. Ayers, United States Congressman from Montana's 2nd congressional district
Elmer Holt, incumbent Governor of Montana
Miles Romney Sr., former State Senator, former Mayor of Hamilton
H. L. Maury
Frank F. Hayes

Results

Republican primary

Candidates
Frank A. Hazelbaker, former Lieutenant Governor of Montana, 1932 Republican nominee for Governor of Montana
Robert Pauline, State Senator, former Mayor of Kalispell

Results

General election

Results

References

Montana
Gubernatorial
1936
November 1936 events